Margaret McIntosh ('Maggie') McEleny MBE (born 1965), also known as "Mad Maggie" for her unshakable desire to compete is a Scottish swimmer. She has paraplegia and epilepsy due to a head injury at age 11, which left her blind for a while. She competed in four Summer Paralympics from 1992 to 2004. In her career, McEleny has won three gold, five silver, and seven bronze medals at the Paralympics.

Awards 
McEleny was appointed Member of the Order of the British Empire (MBE) in the 2000 Birthday Honours for services to disabled swimming.

She was inducted into the Scottish Swimming Hall of Fame in 2018.

She was inducted into the Scottish Women in Sport Hall of Fame in 2018.

References

External links
 
 National Portrait Gallery: Margaret McIntosh ('Maggie') McEleny
McEleny strikes silver as Team GB impress again. Graham Wood, 24 September 2004
Crossing the finish line. Jessica Kiddle, 24 March 2007
Great Britain's medallists: All the British medals from the 2004 Paralympic Games. BBC Sport.
Scottish Institute of Sport: Goldzone 2004. (PDF)
Sports Review 2000. BBC Sport.
Greatest British Olympic and Paralympic moments Daily Telegraph.

1965 births
Living people
Scottish female swimmers
Paralympic swimmers of Great Britain
Swimmers at the 1992 Summer Paralympics
Swimmers at the 1996 Summer Paralympics
Swimmers at the 2000 Summer Paralympics
Swimmers at the 2004 Summer Paralympics
Paralympic gold medalists for Great Britain
Paralympic silver medalists for Great Britain
Paralympic bronze medalists for Great Britain
World record holders in paralympic swimming
Medalists at the 1992 Summer Paralympics
Medalists at the 1996 Summer Paralympics
Medalists at the 2000 Summer Paralympics
Medalists at the 2004 Summer Paralympics
Paralympic medalists in swimming
People with epilepsy
British female freestyle swimmers
British female medley swimmers
British female breaststroke swimmers
S5-classified Paralympic swimmers
Members of the Order of the British Empire